The Nuptials of Corbal is a 1927 historical adventure novel by the British writer Rafael Sabatini. Set during the French Revolution, it portrays the escapades of a Frenchman who saves condemned prisoners from the guillotine.

Film adaptation
In 1936 the story was adapted into a British film The Marriage of Corbal directed by Karl Grune and starring Nils Asther.

References

Bibliography
 Goble, Alan. The Complete Index to Literary Sources in Film. Walter de Gruyter, 1999.

External links
 Full text of The Nuptials of Corbal at the Internet Archive

1927 British novels
British historical novels
British adventure novels
Novels set in the 18th century
Novels set in France
Novels by Rafael Sabatini
British novels adapted into films
Hutchinson (publisher) books
Houghton Mifflin books